Catrin Westerlund (10 April 1934 – 18 September 1982) was a Swedish actress. She appeared in more than 40 films and television shows between 1953 and 1982.

Selected filmography
 Marianne (1953)
 A Night in the Archipelago (1953)
 Café Lunchrasten (1954)
 The Vicious Breed (1954)
 Young Summer (1954)
 The Unicorn (1955)
 The Dance Hall (1955)
 Voyage in the Night (1955)
 Rätten att älska (1956)
 Girls Without Rooms (1956)
 My Passionate Longing (1956)
 Hide and Seek (1963)
 Swedish Wedding Night (1964)
 Want So Much To Believe (1971)
 Världens bästa Karlsson (1974)
 Sagan om Karl-Bertil Jonssons julafton (1975)

References

External links

1934 births
1982 deaths
20th-century Swedish actresses
Swedish film actresses
Swedish television actresses
Actresses from Stockholm